Alexander "Alex" Faribault (June 22, 1806 – November 28, 1882) was an American trading post operator and territorial legislator who helped to found Faribault, Minnesota and was its first postmaster.

Born in Prairie du Chien, Michigan Territory, his father was the fur trapper Jean-Baptiste Faribault. His mother was Elizabeth Pelagie Ainse, a half-Dakota daughter of Joseph-Louis Ainse, a British superintendent at Mackinac. He was considered mixed-blood.

Alexander Faribault married Mary Elizabeth Graham in 1825. Mary was a member of another prominent French-Dakota family. This helped contribute to Faribault's successful business enterprises.

He owned a trading post and in 1851 served in the Minnesota Territorial House of Representatives.

During the Dakota War of 1862, he fought in the Battle of Birch Coulee, the bloodiest battle in the war for American soldiers. During the siege, Alexander Faribault pleaded for peace. Speaking Dakota, Alexander pleaded to Big Eagle, "You do very wrong to fire on us. We did not come out to fight; we only came out to bury the bodies of the white people you killed."

After most Dakota were ordered into exile from their Minnesota homelands in 1863, Faribault sheltered a number of Wahpekute and Mdewakanton people on his farm.

His son-in-law was William Henry Forbes, who also served in the Minnesota Territorial Legislature. Faribault died in Faribault, Minnesota, after suffering a "paralytic shock" (stroke) the previous month.

His house, the Alexander Faribault House, was built in 1853 and is listed on the National Register of Historic Places.

Notes

1806 births
1882 deaths
People from Faribault, Minnesota
People from Prairie du Chien, Wisconsin
Businesspeople from Minnesota
American city founders
Members of the Minnesota Territorial Legislature
19th-century American politicians
19th-century American businesspeople